The Bell Boeing V-22 Osprey is an American military tiltrotor aircraft with an accident history that has generated controversy over its perceived safety. The aircraft was developed by Bell Helicopter and Boeing Helicopters; the companies partner in its manufacture and support.

The V-22 Osprey has had 13 hull loss accidents that have resulted in a total of 51 fatalities. During testing from 1991 to 2006, there were four crashes resulting in 30 fatalities. Since becoming operational in 2007, the V-22 has had eight crashes, including two combat-zone crashes, and several other accidents and incidents that resulted in a total of 21 fatalities.

Crashes and hull–loss accidents

June 1991
On 11 June 1991, a miswired flight control system led to two minor injuries when the left nacelle struck the ground while the aircraft was hovering  in the air, causing it to bounce and catch fire at the New Castle County Airport in Delaware. The pilot, Grady Wilson, suspected that he may have accidentally set the throttle lever the opposite direction to that intended, exacerbating the crash if not causing it.

July 1992
On 20 July 1992, pre-production V-22 #4's right engine failed and caused the aircraft to drop into the Potomac River by Marine Corps Base Quantico with an audience of Department of Defense and industry officials. Flammable liquids collected in the right nacelle and led to an engine fire and subsequent failure.  All seven on board were killed and the V-22 fleet was grounded for 11 months following the accident.  A titanium firewall now protects the composite propshaft.

April 2000

A V-22 loaded with Marines, to simulate a rescue, attempted to land at Marana Northwest Regional Airport in Arizona on 8 April 2000.

The cause was determined to be vortex ring state (VRS), a fundamental limitation on vertical descent which is common to helicopters. Another factor that may have triggered VRS was the operation of multiple aircraft in close proximity, also believed to be a risk factor for VRS in helicopters.

Subsequent testing showed that the V-22 and other tiltrotors are generally less susceptible to VRS than helicopters; VRS entry is more easily recognized, recovery is more intuitive for the pilot, altitude loss is significantly less, and, with sufficient altitude ( or more), VRS recovery is relatively easy. The V-22 has a safe descent envelope as large as or larger than most helicopters, further enhancing its ability to enter and depart hostile landing zones quickly and safely. The project team also dealt with the problem by adding a simultaneous warning light and voice that says "Sink Rate" when the V-22 approaches half of the VRS-vulnerable descent rate.

December 2000
On 11 December 2000, a V-22 had a flight control error and crashed near Jacksonville, North Carolina, killing all four aboard.  A vibration-induced chafing from an adjacent wiring bundle caused a leak in the hydraulic line, which fed the primary side of the swashplate actuators to the right side rotor blade controls.  The leak caused a Primary Flight Control System (PFCS) alert.  A previously-undiscovered error in the aircraft's control software caused it to decelerate in response to each of the pilot's eight attempts to reset the software as a result of the PFCS alert. The uncontrollable aircraft fell  and crashed in a forest.  The wiring harnesses and hydraulic line routing in the nacelles were subsequently modified.  This caused the Marine Corps to ground its fleet of eight V-22s, the second grounding in 2000.

March 2006
A MV-22B experienced an uncommanded engine acceleration while turning on the ground at Marine Corps Air Station New River, NC. Since the aircraft regulates power turbine speed with blade pitch, the reaction caused the aircraft to go airborne with the Torque Control Lever (TCL, or throttle) at idle.  The aircraft rose  into the air (initial estimates suggested 20 to 30 feet) and then fell to the ground, causing damage to its starboard wing; the damage was valued at approximately US$7 million.  It was later found that a miswired cannon plug to one of the engine's two Full Authority Digital Engine Controls (FADEC) was the cause. The FADEC software was also modified to decrease the time needed for switching between the redundant FADECs to eliminate the possibility of a similar mishap occurring in the future.  The aircraft was found to be damaged beyond repair and stricken from Navy's list in July 2009.

April 2010
In April 2010, a CV-22 crashed near the city of Qalat in Zabul Province, Afghanistan. Three US service members and one civilian were killed and 16 injured in the crash.  Initially, it was unclear if the accident was caused by enemy fire.  The loaded CV-22B was at its hovering capability limit, landing at night near Qalat (altitude approx. 5,000 feet) in brownout conditions, in turbulence due to the location in a gully.  The USAF investigation ruled out brownout conditions, enemy fire, and vortex ring state as causes.  The investigation found several factors that significantly contributed to the crash: these include low visibility, a poorly-executed approach, loss of situational awareness, and a high descent rate.

Brig. Gen. Donald Harvel, board president of the first investigation into the crash, fingered the "unidentified contrails" during the last 17 seconds of flight as indications of engine troubles.  Harvel has become a critic of the aircraft since his retirement and states that his retirement was placed on hold for two years to silence him from speaking publicly about his concerns about the aircraft's safety.  The actual causes of the crash may never be known because US military aircraft destroyed the wreckage and black box recorder.  Former USAF chief V-22 systems engineer Eric Braganca stated that the V-22's engines normally emit puffs of smoke and the data recorders showed that the engines were operating normally at that time.

April 2012
On 11 April 2012, an MV-22 from the VMM-261 on  crashed near Tan Tan and Agadir, Morocco, during a joint training exercise, named "African Lion". Two Marines were killed and two others were seriously injured, and the aircraft was lost.  U.S. investigators found no mechanical flaw with the aircraft, and human error was determined to be the cause.

June 2012
On 13 June 2012, a USAF CV-22 crashed at Eglin Air Force Base in Florida during training. All five aboard were injured; two were released from the hospital shortly after.  The aircraft came to rest upside-down and received major damage.  The cause of the crash was determined to be pilot error, with the CV-22 flying through the proprotor wash of another aircraft. The USAF restarted formation flight training in response.

May 2015
One of three Osprey aircraft participating in a training exercise at Bellows Air Force Station (Waimanalo, Oahu, Hawaii) suffered from dust intake to the right engine, sustained a hard landing with fuselage damage and caught fire. The accident led to the deaths of two U.S. Marines, and injuries to 20 others. The accident caused Marines to recommend improved air filters, and require reduced hover time in dust from 60 to 30 seconds, although most pilots rarely spend more than 10 seconds in dusty conditions.

December 2016
All five crew members aboard with Marine Aircraft Group 36, 1st Marine Aircraft Wing were rescued. Two crew members were injured, and all were transported for treatment. Ospreys in Japan were grounded the following day.<ref>オスプレイ墜落：機体折れ、無残　衝撃の大きさ物語る【写真特集】, Okinawa Times, 14 December 2016. Retrieved 10 February 2017.</ref>  An investigation into the mishap was launched. Preliminary reports indicated that, during in-flight refueling with a HC-130, the refueling hose was struck by the Osprey's rotor blades. On 18 December, after a review of MV-22 safety procedures, the III Marine Expeditionary Force (IIIMEF) announced that it would resume flight operations, concluding that they were confident that the mishap was due "solely to the aircraft's rotor blades coming into contact with the refueling line."

 August 2017 

September 2017
On 28 September 2017, a V-22 Osprey operating in Syria as part of Operation Inherent Resolve was damaged beyond repair in a hard landing. Two people on board the aircraft were injured.2 Troops Injured in Non-Combat V-22 Crash in Syria Military.com The non–salvageable Osprey burned shortly after the crash.

March 2022
On 18 March 2022, a U.S. Marine Corps MV-22B participating in military exercise Cold Response crashed in Gråtådalen, a valley in Beiarn, Norway. The aircraft was carrying a crew of four Marines. All four crew members were confirmed dead shortly after Norwegian authorities discovered the crash site. Investigators concluded that the causal factor of the crash was pilot error due to low altitude steep bank angle maneuvers exceeding the aircraft's normal operating envelope. Investigators note that an unauthorized personal GoPro recording device was found at the crash site and was in use at the time of the crash. "Such devices are prohibited on grounds that they can incentivize risktaking and serve as a distraction; that may have been the case with Ghost 31," the report reads.

June 2022
An Osprey belonging to 3rd Marine Aircraft Wing crashed near Glamis, California on 8 June 2022, killing five Marines onboard. Initial reports erroneously claimed there was nuclear material on board the aircraft.Reyes, Jesus (Jun. 8, 2022)."Military plane crashes in Imperial County; No nuclear material aboard aircraft". KESQ Among the fatalities was Captain John J. Sax, son of the former baseball major leaguer and LA Dodger Steve Sax.

Other accidents and notable incidents

July 2006
A V-22 experienced compressor stalls in its right engine in the middle of its first transatlantic flight to the United Kingdom for the Royal International Air Tattoo and Farnborough Airshow on 11 July 2006.  It had to be diverted to Iceland for maintenance. A week later it was announced that other V-22s had been having compressor surges and stalls, and the Navy launched an investigation into it.

December 2006
It was reported that a serious nacelle fire occurred on a Marine MV-22 at New River in December 2006. 

March 2007
A V-22 experienced a hydraulic leak that led to an engine-compartment fire before takeoff on 29 March 2007.

November 2007
An MV-22 Osprey of VMMT-204 caught on fire during a training mission and was forced to make an emergency landing at Camp Lejeune on 6 November 2007.  The fire, which started in one of the engine nacelles, caused significant aircraft damage, but no injuries.

After an investigation, it was determined that a design flaw with the engine air particle separator (EAPS) caused it to jam in flight, causing a shock wave in the hydraulics system and subsequent leaks. Hydraulic fluid leaked into the IR suppressors and was the cause of the nacelle fires. As a result, all Block A V-22 aircraft were placed under flight restrictions until modification kits could be installed.  No fielded Marine MV-22s were affected, as those Block B aircraft already incorporated the modification.

2009
An Air Force CV-22 suffered a Class A mishap with more than a $1 million in damage during FY 2009. No details were released.

July 2011
On 7 July 2011, an MV-22 crew chief from VMM-264 squadron fell nearly 200 ft to his death in southwestern Afghanistan.

October 2014
The aircraft splashed down in the Arabian Sea and was briefly partially submerged  before the pilots regained control and landed on the carrier deck. One marine drowned after his life preserver failed to inflate when he bailed out of the aircraft. The accident was attributed to the aircraft being accidentally started in maintenance mode, which reduces engine power by a fifth.

January 2017
On 29 January 2017, an MV-22 experienced a hard landing during the Yakla raid in Al Bayda, Yemen against Al-Qaeda in the Arabian Peninsula militants, causing two injuries to U.S. troops. The aircraft could not fly afterward and was destroyed by U.S. airstrikes.

References

 Norton, Bill. Bell Boeing V-22 Osprey, Tiltrotor Tactical Transport''. Midland Publishing, 2004. .
 Whittle, Richard. The Dream Machine: The Untold History of the Notorious V-22 Osprey. New York: Simon & Schuster, 2010. .

External links
 A video footage of the 1991 Osprey crash with commentary

V-22 Osprey
Lists of aviation accidents and incidents